Carnspindle is a townland of 217 acres in County Antrim, Northern Ireland. It is situated in the civil parish of Islandmagee and the historic barony of Belfast Lower.

The small village of Mill Bay is within the townland.

See also 
List of townlands in County Antrim

References

Townlands of County Antrim
Civil parish of Island Magee